Transcription factor HES-5 is a protein that in humans is encoded by the HES5 gene.

HES5 regulates the development of the early brain by maintaining stem cell neural progenitors in the ventricular zone. HES5 expression significantly higher in squamous cervical carcinoma than in CIN as well as higher in CIN than normal cervical epithelia. Human HES5 gene binds to Notch receptor and expression of HES5 decreases during cartilage differentiation.

References

Further reading

External links 
 

Transcription factors